The Kochi reaction is an organic reaction for the decarboxylation of carboxylic acids to alkyl halides with lead(IV) acetate and a lithium halide.

The reaction is a variation of the Hunsdiecker reaction.

References

Organic reactions
Name reactions